Trona Airport  is a public airport five miles north of Trona, in Inyo County, California. It is owned by the United States Department of the Interior, Bureau of Land Management. The National Plan of Integrated Airport Systems for 2011–2015 categorized it as a general aviation facility.

Most U.S. airports use the same three-letter location identifier for the FAA and IATA, but this airport is L72 to the FAA and has IATA code TRH.

History
During World War II it was an outlying airstrip supporting the U.S. Marine Corps Auxiliary Air Station Mojave located near Mojave, California.

In 1976-78 Golden West Airlines scheduled de Havilland Canada DHC-6 Twin Otters direct to Los Angeles (LAX).

The musical group The Corrs shot their YouTube music video "Breathless" at Trona Airport on May 17–19, 2000, which hit #7 on Billboard charts in 2000.

Facilities
Trona Airport covers 150 acres (61 ha) at an elevation of 1,718 feet (524 m). Its one runway, 17/35, is 5,910 by 60 feet (1,801 x 18 m). It has one helipad, H1, 52 by 52 feet (16 x 16 m).

In the year ending April 9, 2012 the airport had 7,000 general aviation aircraft operations, average 19 per day. Two ultralight aircraft were then based at this airport.

References

External links 
 WW2 Military Airfields including Auxiliaries and Support fields: Alabama - California
 Aerial photo as of May 1994 from USGS The National Map

Airports in San Bernardino County, California
Airfields of the United States Marine Corps
Bureau of Land Management